Vasaborg was a noble family of Sweden and a branch of the House of Vasa.

Origins

King Gustav II Adolf of Sweden had an illegitimate son called Gustav Gustavsson who in 1637 was ennobled under the name of Vasaborg, echoing his father's House of Vasa.

Queen Christina of Sweden raised her illegitimate half-brother to the dignity of a count when she gave him the Countship of Nystad in 1647. He and his family were registered to the Swedish House of Knights as its sixth comital family. Count Gustav's wife was Countess Anna Sofia of Wied-Runkel.

The Vasaborg coat of arms depicted a sheaf of hay, representing the arms of Vasa, crossed by a diagonal bend sinister, indicating Gustav's illegitimate origins.

The family of Vasaborg lived mostly in the new Swedish possessions of Lower Saxony, where they received several estates. Their seat was at Wildeshausen, which was received by the first Count after the Peace of Westphalia in 1648.

The second count of Nystad
The second count of Nystad, Gustav Adolf (1653-1732), was a lieutenant colonel. His wife was countess Angelica Catharina of Leiningen-Westerburg. In 1679, following the Treaty of Nijmegen, Sweden pawned Wildeshausen's overlordship to the Prince-Bishop of Münster in exchange for a loan of 100,000 Riksdaler. Sweden lost the county in 1721, and the second count subjected himself to King George I of Great Britain.

Stralenheim-Vasaborg
The male line of the house of Vasaborg became extinct in 1754 with the death of the third count, George Maurice of Vasaborg (1678-1754). He was also the last male descendant of the House of Vasa. His remaining sister and the last official bearer of their surname, countess Henrietta Polyxena (1696-1777) died in 1777.

However, two Vasaborg descendants survived: the children of George Maurice's late sister, the countess Sophia Elisabeth Christina of Vasaborg (1694-1736?) and her husband, Count Henning von Stralenheim (1663-1731), the sometime governor-general of Zweibrücken. These descendants were daughter Catharina Sophia (1717–64), who married the baron Eric Sparre (1700–42), Lord of Forbach in Lorraine; and son Count Henning Gustav (1719-1787).

With the fading of the Vasaborg line, Henning Gustav von Stralenheim was adopted into it and began to use both names, typically written in Germany as "Count von Stralenheim-Wasaburg." He married baroness Caroline von Esebeck (born in 1746) and had children who continued the Vasaborg name, the male line of which died out in 1872 and the female line of which still exists.

In 1777, King Gustav III of Sweden forbade his distant cousin Henning Gustav from using the Swedish title and name Vasaborg, due to the king's pride for his own female-line ancestry from the royal Vasa dynasty. Because Vasaborg was outside of Swedish dominions, and the house's comital rank and titles were granted by the Holy Roman Empire, this Swedish royal declaration had very little effect in reality. Foreign counts and nobility listings continued using the name Stralenheim-Wasaburg.

Of Count Henning Gustav's children, his daughter Christiana Louise (1783-1857) married the Swedish Count Charles Adam Lewenhaupt (1760-1821) and left descendants in Sweden. Henning Gustav's oldest son, Count Heinrich Gustav (1766–1818), lived in Bavaria; his middle son, Count Carl August (1780-1842), in France, where his descendants reside. The youngest son, Count Charles Andrew Maurice (1810–72), was the last male count of Stralenheim-Wasaburg and left only daughters.

Finnish noble families
Swedish noble families